Hasihin bin Sanawi (born 15 June 1983) is a Malaysian Paralympic archer.

In the 2012 Summer Paralympics, Sanawi won a silver medal. He was Malaysia's first Paralympic medalist in Archery.

References

Sportspeople from Kuala Lumpur
Malaysian people of Malay descent
Archers at the 2012 Summer Paralympics
Archers at the 2016 Summer Paralympics
Paralympic silver medalists for Malaysia
Living people
Malaysian male archers
1983 births
Medalists at the 2012 Summer Paralympics
Paralympic medalists in archery